Paruhatlek Sitchunthong is a former Thai Muay Thai fighter who competed from 1980s to 1990s. He is the only fighter to have beaten legend Samart Payakaroon in Muay Thai rules by knockout.

Biography and career
All of his brothers were fighters. His older brother is also a famous Muay Thai fighter, Paruhat Loh-ngoen. He started his Muay Thai training at the age 9 in a space near his house with his father as a trainer. He had his first fight a few months later, he got only 15 baht for it.A year later Paruhatlek joined the Sichunthong gym, his family business. This gym originally belonged to his father, Kimchun Kuntharee. When his father died, his mother, Luan Kuntharee continued to run the operation.

He had his first fight in Lumpinee Stadium at the age of 16.

He fought Samart Payakaroon four-times in total. He won by knock out on the second time in the third round with punches. His older brother, Paruhat Loh-ngoen had also fought with Samart Payakaroon and was one of two opponents that Samart said he was the most afraid (other one was Mafuang Weerapol).

Paruhatlek Sitchunthong was a five-times Lumpinee Stadium champion across four weight categories, consist of pinweight (102 lb), mini flyweight (104 lb, two-times), junior flyweight (108 lb), and flyweight (112 lb). To win his first belt Paruhatlek needed three attempts before being successful. At the peak of his career, he was paid a maximum of 120,000 baht.

Paruhatlek was regarded as a small shape fighter, therefore he was often at a disadvantage against his opponents. He was a tough fighter who never backed down, pushing forward for the win with his heavy punches. Hence, he was given the fierce alias of "Raging bull of the Rangsit field", owing to his birthplace, Rangsit area. He also received another alias the "ring gentleman", during a fight against Fahlan Lukprabat he had his opponent on the verge of collapsing but chose to step back and let him lose by decision to avoid stripping him from his Rajadamnern Stadium belt.

He has been collecting the Muay Thai trunks he wore during his entire career, most of them are red trunks, because he often fought in the red corner.

Titles & honours
Lumpinee Stadium
 1981 Lumpinee Stadium 102 lbs Champion
 1982 Lumpinee Stadium 102 lbs Champion (defended once)
 1983 Lumpinee Stadium 108 lbs Champion (defended four times)
 1985 Lumpinee Stadium 108 lbs Champion 
 1988 Lumpinee Stadium 112 lbs Champion
 1989 Lumpinee Stadium Fight of the Year (vs. Pongsiri Por Ruamrudee)

Fight record

|- style="text-align:center; background:#fbb;"
| 1992- || Loss ||align=left| Kasemlek Singmanee || Lumpinee Stadium ||  Bangkok, Thailand  || Decision ||5 ||3:00

|- style="text-align:center; background:#fbb;"
| 1992-05-02 || Loss ||align=left| Chatchai Paiseetong || Lumpinee Stadium ||  Bangkok, Thailand  || Decision ||5 ||3:00

|- style="text-align:center; background:#fbb;"
| 1991-02-12 || Loss ||align=left| Nungubon Sitlerchai || Lumpinee Stadium ||  Bangkok, Thailand  || Decision ||5 ||3:00

|-  style="text-align:center; background:#fbb;"
| 1990-08-31 || Loss ||align=left| Orono Por Muang Ubon || Lumpinee Stadium || Bangkok, Thailand || Decision  || 5 || 3:00

|-  style="text-align:center; background:#cfc;"
| 1990-07-29 || Win||align=left| Maikel Lieuwfat ||  || England || TKO || 4 || 

|-  style="text-align:center; background:#fbb;"
| 1990-07-10|| Loss ||align=left| Chandet Sor Prantalay || Lumpinee Stadium || Bangkok, Thailand || Decision || 5 || 3:00

|-  style="background:#fbb;"
| 1990-05-29 || Loss ||align=left| Mathee Jadeepitak || Lumpinee Stadium || Bangkok, Thailand || Decision || 5 || 3:00

|- style="text-align:center; background:#fbb;"
| 1990-04-30 || Loss ||align=left| Pongsiri Por Ruamrudee ||  Lumpinee Stadium  ||  Bangkok, Thailand  || Decision || 5 || 3:00

|- style="text-align:center; background:#fbb;"
| 1990-03-06 || Loss ||align=left| Chainoi Muangsurin||  Lumpinee Stadium  ||  Bangkok, Thailand  || Decision || 5 || 3:00

|- style="text-align:center; background:#fbb;"
| 1990-01-30 || Loss ||align=left| Pongsiri Por Ruamrudee ||  Lumpinee Stadium  ||  Bangkok, Thailand  || Decision || 5 || 3:00

|- style="text-align:center; background:#cfc;"
| 1989-12-12 || Win ||align=left| Thanongchai Charoenmuang ||  Lumpinee Stadium  ||  Bangkok, Thailand  || Decision || 5 || 3:00

|- style="text-align:center; background:#fbb;"
| 1989-11-11 || Loss ||align=left| Toto Por.Pongsawang ||    ||  Nakhon Pathom, Thailand  || Decision || 5 || 3:00 

|- style="text-align:center; background:#fbb;"
| 1989-11-03 || Loss ||align=left| Namkabuan Nongkeepahuyuth || Lumpinee Stadium || Bangkok, Thailand  || Decision || 5 || 3:00

|-  style="text-align:center; background:#fbb;"
| 1989-10-20|| Loss||align=left| Pairojnoi Sor Siamchai || Lumpinee Stadium || Bangkok, Thailand ||Decision || 5 || 3:00

|-  style="text-align:center; background:#c5d2ea;"
| 1989-09-08|| Draw||align=left| Pairojnoi Sor Siamchai || Lumpinee Stadium || Bangkok, Thailand ||Decision || 5 || 3:00

|-  style="text-align:center; background:#c5d2ea;"
| 1989-08-15|| Draw||align=left| Pairojnoi Sor Siamchai || Lumpinee Stadium || Bangkok, Thailand ||Decision || 5 || 3:00

|- style="text-align:center; background:#fbb;"
| 1989-07-25 || Loss ||align=left| Panphet Muangsurin || Lumpinee Stadium ||  Bangkok, Thailand  || Decision || 5 || 3:00

|- style="text-align:center; background:#fbb;"
| 1989-06-26 || Loss ||align=left| Seesot Sahakarnosot || Rajadamnern Stadium ||  Bangkok, Thailand  || Decision || 5 || 3:00

|-  style="text-align:center; background:#c5d2ea;"
| 1989-05-30|| Draw||align=left| Pairojnoi Sor Siamchai || Lumpinee Stadium || Bangkok, Thailand ||Decision || 5 || 3:00

|- style="text-align:center; background:#fbb;"
| 1989-05-02 || Loss ||align=left| Kaensak Sor.Ploenjit || Lumpinee Stadium ||  Bangkok, Thailand  || Decision || 5 || 3:00
|-
! style=background:white colspan=9 |

|- style="text-align:center; background:#cfc;"
| 1989-03-29 || Win ||align=left| Toto Por.Pongsawang ||  Lumpinee Stadium  ||  Bangkok, Thailand  || Decision || 5 || 3:00 

|-  style="text-align:center; background:#fbb;"
| 1989-02-21 || Loss ||align=left| Langsuan Panyuthaphum || Lumpinee Stadium || Bangkok, Thailand || Decision || 5 || 3:00

|- style="text-align:center; background:#cfc;"
| 1989-01-06 || Win ||align=left| Pongsiri Por Ruamrudee || Lumpinee Stadium  ||  Bangkok, Thailand  || Decision || 5 || 3:00

|-  style="text-align:center; background:#cfc;"
| 1988-12-02|| Win ||align=left| Seesot Sahakarnosot || Lumpinee Stadium || Bangkok, Thailand || Decision || 5 || 3:00

|- style="text-align:center; background:#fbb;"
| 1988-10-28 || Loss ||align=left| Karuhat Sor.Supawan || Lumpinee Stadium ||  Bangkok, Thailand  || Decision || 5 || 3:00

|-  style="text-align:center; background:#cfc;"
| 1988-10-11|| Win ||align=left| Hippy Singmanee || Lumpinee Stadium || Bangkok, Thailand || Decision || 5 || 3:00

|-  style="text-align:center; background:#fbb;"
| 1988-09-09|| Loss ||align=left| Thammawit Sor.Badin || Lumpinee Stadium || Bangkok, Thailand || Decision || 5 || 3:00

|-  style="text-align:center; background:#cfc;"
| 1988-08-18|| Win ||align=left| Odnoi Lukprabat || Rajadamnern Stadium || Bangkok, Thailand || Decision || 5 || 3:00

|- style="text-align:center; background:#fbb;"
| 1988-07-26 || Loss ||align=left| Veeraphol Sahaprom || Lumpinee Stadium  ||  Bangkok, Thailand  || Decision || 5 || 3:00 

|-  style="text-align:center; background:#cfc;"
| 1988-06-24|| Win ||align=left| Phetchan Sakwicha || Lumpinee Stadium || Bangkok, Thailand || Decision || 5 || 3:00

|-  style="text-align:center; background:#cfc;"
| 1988-05-31|| Win ||align=left| Sangwannoi Sor.Rungroj || Lumpinee Stadium || Bangkok, Thailand || Decision || 5 || 3:00

|-  style="text-align:center; background:#cfc;"
| 1988-05-03|| Win ||align=left| Detduang Por.Pongsawang || Lumpinee Stadium || Bangkok, Thailand || Decision || 5 || 3:00
|-
! style=background:white colspan=9 |

|-  style="text-align:center; background:#cfc;"
| 1988-03-25|| Win ||align=left| Wangchannoi Sor Palangchai || Lumpinee Stadium || Bangkok, Thailand || Decision || 5 || 3:00

|-  style="text-align:center; background:#cfc;"
| 1988-03-04|| Win||align=left| Hippy Singmanee || Lumpinee Stadium || Bangkok, Thailand || Decision || 5 || 3:00

|-  style="text-align:center; background:#cfc;"
| 1988-01-26|| Win||align=left| Morakot Chor.Waikul || Lumpinee Stadium || Bangkok, Thailand || Decision || 5 || 3:00

|-  style="text-align:center; background:#fbb;"
| 1987-12-08 || Loss ||align=left| Odnoi Lukprabat || Lumpinee Stadium || Bangkok, Thailand || Decision || 5 || 3:00

|-  style="text-align:center; background:#fbb;"
| 1987-10-19 || Loss ||align=left| Jaroenthong Kiatbanchong || Lumpinee Stadium || Bangkok, Thailand || Decision || 5 || 3:00

|-  style="text-align:center; background:#fbb;"
| 1987-08-28 || Loss ||align=left| Langsuan Panyuthaphum || Lumpinee Stadium || Bangkok, Thailand || Decision || 5 || 3:00

|-  style="text-align:center; background:#fbb;"
| 1987-07-24|| Loss ||align=left| Dokmaipa Por Pongsawang || Lumpinee Stadium || Bangkok, Thailand || Decision || 5 || 3:00

|-  style="text-align:center; background:#cfc;"
| 1987-06-19 || Win||align=left| Langsuan Panyuthaphum || Lumpinee Stadium || Bangkok, Thailand || Decision || 5 || 3:00

|-  style="text-align:center; background:#cfc;"
| 1987-06-02 || Win||align=left| Seesot Sor Ritthichai || Lumpinee Stadium || Bangkok, Thailand || KO (Punches)|| 2 || 

|-  style="text-align:center; background:#fbb;"
| 1987-04-10 || Loss||align=left| Baber Lukjaomaejamadewi  || Lumpinee Stadium || Bangkok, Thailand || Decision || 5 || 3:00

|-  style="text-align:center; background:#fbb;"
| 1987-03-06 || Loss||align=left| Baber Lukjaomaejamadewi  || Lumpinee Stadium || Bangkok, Thailand || Decision || 5 || 3:00

|-  style="text-align:center; background:#cfc;"
| 1987-02-06 || Win||align=left| Dennua Denmolee || Lumpinee Stadium || Bangkok, Thailand || KO (Punches)|| 1 || 

|-  style="text-align:center; background:#cfc;"
| 1987-01-13 || Win||align=left| Dejsak Payaksakda || Lumpinee Stadium || Bangkok, Thailand || Decision || 5 || 3:00

|-  style="text-align:center; background:#fbb;"
| 1986-12-19|| Loss ||align=left| Dejsak Payaksakda || Huamark Stadium || Bangkok, Thailand || Decision || 5 || 3:00

|-  style="text-align:center; background:#fbb;"
| 1986-11-25|| Loss ||align=left| Burklerk Pinsinchai || Lumpinee Stadium || Bangkok, Thailand || Decision || 5 || 3:00
|-
! style=background:white colspan=9 |

|- style="text-align:center; background:#cfc;"
| 1986-09-12 || Win ||align=left| Wangchannoi Sor Palangchai || Lumpinee Stadium ||  Bangkok, Thailand  || Decision || 5 || 3:00 

|-  style="text-align:center; background:#cfc;"
| 1986-08-22|| Win ||align=left| Dennua Denmolee || Lumpinee Stadium|| Bangkok, Thailand || Decision || 5 || 3:00

|-  style="text-align:center; background:#cfc;"
| 1986-06-13|| Win ||align=left| Sueasaming Sitchang || || Bangkok, Thailand || Decision || 5 || 3:00

|-  style="text-align:center; background:#cfc;"
| 1986-05-06|| Win ||align=left| Paiboon Fairtex || Lumpinee Stadium || Bangkok, Thailand || Decision || 5 || 3:00

|-  style="text-align:center; background:#cfc;"
| 1986-03-28|| Win ||align=left| Detduang Por.Pongsawang || Lumpinee Stadium || Bangkok, Thailand || Decision || 5 || 3:00

|-  style="text-align:center; background:#cfc;"
| 1986-02-25|| Win ||align=left| Supernoi Sitchokchai || Lumpinee Stadium || Bangkok, Thailand || Decision || 5 || 3:00  

|-  style="text-align:center; background:#fbb;"
| 1986-01-18|| Loss||align=left| Supernoi Sitchokchai || Lumpinee Stadium || Bangkok, Thailand || Decision || 5 || 3:00  
|-
! style=background:white colspan=9 |

|-  style="text-align:center; background:#cfc;"
| 1985-12-07|| Win||align=left| Fahlan Lukprabat || Lumpinee Stadium || Bangkok, Thailand || Decision || 5 || 3:00  
|-
! style=background:white colspan=9 |

|-  style="text-align:center; background:#fbb;"
| 1985-11-19 || Loss ||align=left| Kongsak Sitsamtahan || Lumpinee Stadium || Bangkok, Thailand || Decision|| 5 ||3:00

|-  style="text-align:center; background:#cfc;"
| 1985-10-18 || Win ||align=left| Sangchai Singkiri || Lumpinee Stadium || Bangkok, Thailand || Decision|| 5 ||3:00

|-  style="text-align:center; background:#cfc;"
| 1985-09-20 || Win ||align=left| Dennua Denmolee || Lumpinee Stadium || Bangkok, Thailand || Decision|| 5 ||3:00 

|-  style="text-align:center; background:#fbb;"
| 1985-07-26|| Loss||align=left| Odnoi Lukprabat || Lumpinee Stadium || Bangkok, Thailand || Decision || 5 || 3:00  
|-
! style=background:white colspan=9 |

|-  style="text-align:center; background:#fbb;"
| 1985-05-10 || Loss ||align=left| Sangwannoi Sitsahapan || Lumpinee Stadium || Bangkok, Thailand || Decision|| 5 ||3:00 

|-  style="text-align:center; background:#fbb;"
| 1985-04-16 || Loss ||align=left| Sanit Wichitkriengkrai || Lumpinee Stadium || Bangkok, Thailand || Decision|| 5 ||3:00 

|-  style="text-align:center; background:#cfc;"
| 1985-04-02|| Win ||align=left| Odnoi Lukprabat || Lumpinee Stadium || Bangkok, Thailand || KO || 3 ||   
|-
! style=background:white colspan=9 |

|-  style="text-align:center; background:#fbb;"
| 1985-01-25 || Loss ||align=left| Dennua Denmolee || || Chiang Mai, Thailand || Decision|| 5 ||3:00 

|-  style="text-align:center; background:#c5d2ea;"
| 1985-01-11|| Draw ||align=left| Detduang Por.Pongsawang || Lumpinee Stadium || Bangkok, Thailand || Decision ||5 || 3:00
|-
! style=background:white colspan=9 |

|-  style="text-align:center; background:#cfc;"
| 1984-11-30 || Win ||align=left| Dennua Denmolee || || Bangkok, Thailand || Decision|| 5 ||3:00 

|-  style="text-align:center; background:#cfc;"
| 1984-11-09 || Win ||align=left| Wanlopnoi Nauamthong ||Lumpinee Stadium || Bangkok, Thailand || Decision || 5 || 3:00 

|-  style="text-align:center; background:#;"
| 1984-07-10 ||  ||align=left| Sakkasemnoi Fairtex ||Lumpinee Stadium || Bangkok, Thailand || ||  || 

|-  style="text-align:center; background:#cfc;"
| 1984-04-24 || Win ||align=left| Chanchai Sor Tamarangsri ||Lumpinee Stadium || Bangkok, Thailand || Decision || 5 || 3:00 

|-  style="text-align:center; background:#c5d2ea;"
| 1984-03-30 || Draw||align=left| Chanchai Sor Tamarangsri ||Lumpinee Stadium || Bangkok, Thailand || Decision || 5 || 3:00 
|-
! style=background:white colspan=9 |

|-  style="text-align:center; background:#fbb;"
| 1983-12-26 || Loss ||align=left| Saencherng Pinsinchai ||Lumpinee Stadium || Bangkok, Thailand || Decision|| 5 ||3:00 

|-  style="text-align:center; background:#cfc;"
| 1983-11-11 || Win ||align=left| Reengsaknoi Rojsongkram || Lumpinee Stadium || Bangkok, Thailand || Decision|| 5 ||3:00 

|-  style="text-align:center; background:#fbb;"
| 1983-10-23 || Loss ||align=left| Reengsaknoi Rojsongkram || Lumpinee Stadium || Bangkok, Thailand || Decision|| 5 ||3:00 

|-  style="text-align:center; background:#cfc;"
| 1983-10-06|| Win||align=left| Ole Sakwittaya ||  || Saraburi, Thailand || KO || 3 ||  

|-  style="text-align:center; background:#fbb;"
| 1983-09-02 || Loss ||align=left| Reengsaknoi Rojsongkram || Lumpinee Stadium || Bangkok, Thailand || Decision|| 5 ||3:00 

|-  style="text-align:center; background:#cfc;"
| 1983-08-05|| Win||align=left| Ole Sakwittaya || Lumpinee Stadium || Bangkok, Thailand || Decision || 5 || 3:00  

|-  style="text-align:center; background:#cfc;"
| 1983-07-12|| Win||align=left| Yungnongkhai Sitwaiwat || Lumpinee Stadium || Bangkok, Thailand || KO || 1 ||   
|-
! style=background:white colspan=9 | 

|-  style="text-align:center; background:#cfc;"
| 1983-05-24|| Win||align=left| Sornaranoi Sakwittaya || Lumpinee Stadium || Bangkok, Thailand || Decision || 5 || 3:00  

|-  style="text-align:center; background:#cfc;"
| 1983-05-10|| Win||align=left| Chakpethnoi Sitsei || Lumpinee Stadium || Bangkok, Thailand || Decision || 5 || 3:00  

|-  style="text-align:center; background:#fbb;"
| 1983-03-25|| Loss||align=left| Chakpethnoi Sitsei || Lumpinee Stadium || Bangkok, Thailand || Decision || 5 || 3:00  

|-  style="text-align:center; background:#cfc;"
| 1983-03-12|| Win||align=left| Sanphet Sor Wongsiam ||  || Chanthaburi, Thailand || Decision || 5 || 3:00  
|-
! style=background:white colspan=9 |

|-  style="text-align:center; background:#fbb;"
| 1983-01-23 || Loss ||align=left| Nopachai Lukmingkwan ||Lumpinee Stadium || Bangkok, Thailand || Decision || 5 ||3:00  

|-  style="text-align:center; background:#cfc;"
| 1983-01-07|| Win||align=left| Kaophong Sitmorbon || Lumpinee Stadium || Bangkok, Thailand || Decision || 5 || 3:00  
|-
! style=background:white colspan=9 | 

|-  style="text-align:center; background:#cfc;"
| 1982-12-07|| Win||align=left| Chakpethnoi Sitsei || Lumpinee Stadium || Bangkok, Thailand || Decision || 5 || 3:00  
|-
! style=background:white colspan=9 |

|-  style="text-align:center; background:#cfc;"
| 1982-11-13 || Win ||align=left| Yongyuthnoi Sakchaisit|| || Bangkok, Thailand || Decision|| 5 ||3:00 

|-  style="text-align:center; background:#cfc;"
| 1982-10-15 || Win ||align=left| Sakkasemnoi Fairtex ||Lumpinee Stadium || Bangkok, Thailand || Decision || 5 ||3:00 

|-  style="text-align:center; background:#fbb;"
| 1982-07-02 || Loss ||align=left| Yongyuthnoi Sakchaisit|| || Bangkok, Thailand || Decision|| 5 ||3:00  

|-  style="text-align:center; background:#cfc;"
| 1982-06-11 || Win||align=left| Paiboon Fairtex||Lumpinee Stadium || Bangkok, Thailand || Decision || 5 ||3:00

|-  style="text-align:center; background:#fbb;"
| 1982-05-21 || Loss ||align=left| Palannoi Kiatanan||Lumpinee Stadium || Bangkok, Thailand || Decision || 5 ||3:00  
|-
! style=background:white colspan=9 |

|-  style="text-align:center; background:#fbb;"
| 1982-04-23 || Loss ||align=left| Reengsaknoi Rojsongkram || || Bangkok, Thailand || Decision|| 5 ||3:00  

|-  style="text-align:center; background:#fbb;"
| 1982-04-02 || Loss ||align=left| Pornsaknoi Sitchang ||Lumpinee Stadium || Bangkok, Thailand || Decision|| 5 ||3:00  

|-  style="text-align:center; background:#cfc;"
| 1982-03-12 || Win ||align=left| Nopachai Lukmingkwan ||Lumpinee Stadium || Bangkok, Thailand || KO || 2 ||  

|-  style="text-align:center; background:#cfc;"
| 1982-01-15 || Win ||align=left| Reengsaknoi Rojsongkram ||Lumpinee Stadium ||  Bangkok, Thailand || Decision|| 5 ||3:00  

|-  style="text-align:center; background:#cfc;"
| 1981-12-22 || Win ||align=left| Tokiattisak Kangka ||Lumpinee Stadium || Bangkok, Thailand || Decision|| 5 ||3:00  

|-  style="text-align:center; background:#cfc;"
| 1981-11-17 || Win ||align=left| Boonam Sor.Jarunee ||Lumpinee Stadium || Bangkok, Thailand || Decision|| 5 ||3:00  

|-  style="text-align:center; background:#;"
| 1981-10-05 ||  ||align=left| Rongnarong Thairungruang ||Rajadamnern Stadium || Bangkok, Thailand || ||  ||  

|-  style="text-align:center; background:#fbb;"
| 1981-09-04 || Loss ||align=left| Wanmai Phetbandit ||Lumpinee Stadium || Bangkok, Thailand || Decision|| 5 ||3:00  

|-  style="text-align:center; background:#cfc;"
| 1981-07-14 || Win ||align=left| Wanmai Phetbandit ||Lumpinee Stadium || Bangkok, Thailand || Decision ||5  ||3:00  

|-  style="text-align:center; background:#;"
| 1981-06-26 ||  ||align=left| Surasak Chomsrimek ||Lumpinee Stadium || Bangkok, Thailand || ||  ||  

|-  style="text-align:center; background:#fbb;"
| 1981-04-28 || Loss ||align=left| Wisanupon Saksamut ||Lumpinee Stadium || Bangkok, Thailand || Decision || 5 ||3:00 

|-  style="text-align:center; background:#cfc;"
| 1981-04-20 || Win ||align=left| Weerachai Skahomkai ||Lumpinee Stadium || Bangkok, Thailand || Decision || 5 ||3:00 

|-  style="text-align:center; background:#fbb;"
| 1980-12-05|| Loss||align=left| Klaynoi Rasmeechan || Lumpinee Stadium || Bangkok, Thailand || Decision || 5 || 3:00

|-  style="text-align:center; background:#cfc;"
| 1980-11-11|| Win ||align=left| Sichanglek Luk.KM-16	|| Lumpinee Stadium || Bangkok, Thailand || Decision || 5 || 3:00

|-  style="text-align:center; background:#fbb;"
| 1980-10-14|| Loss||align=left| Kattisak Gangka || Lumpinee Stadium || Bangkok, Thailand || Decision || 5 || 3:00

|-  style="text-align:center; background:#fbb;"
| 1980-09-23|| Loss||align=left| Chamuekpet Hapalang || Lumpinee Stadium || Bangkok, Thailand || Decision || 5 || 3:00  
|-
! style=background:white colspan=9 |

|-  style="text-align:center; background:#cfc;"
| 1980-08-29|| Win ||align=left| Somsaknoi Kiatyothin || Lumpinee Stadium || Bangkok, Thailand || Decision || 5 || 3:00

|-  style="text-align:center; background:#cfc;"
| 1980-07-29|| Win ||align=left| Khoksamrong Sor.Sakwit || Lumpinee Stadium || Bangkok, Thailand || Decision || 5 || 3:00

|-  style="text-align:center; background:#fbb;"
| 1980-06-28|| Loss ||align=left| Chamuekpet Hapalang || Lumpinee Stadium || Bangkok, Thailand || Decision || 5 || 3:00  

|-  style="text-align:center; background:#fbb;"
| 1980-06-07|| Loss ||align=left| Samart Payakaroon || Lumpinee Stadium || Bangkok, Thailand || Decision || 5 || 3:00 
|-
! style=background:white colspan=9 |

|-  style="text-align:center; background:#cfc;"
| 1980-05-13|| Win ||align=left| Jampatong Na Nontachai || Lumpinee Stadium || Bangkok, Thailand || KO || 5 ||

|-  style="text-align:center; background:#cfc;"
| 1980-04-18|| Win||align=left| Kongsamut Sor.Thanikul || Lumpinee Stadium || Bangkok, Thailand || Decision || 5 || 3:00 

|-  style="text-align:center; background:#fbb;"
| 1980-03-14|| Loss ||align=left| Samart Payakaroon ||  || Pattaya, Thailand || Decision || 5 || 3:00

|-  style="text-align:center; background:#cfc;"
| 1980-02-22|| Win||align=left| Fahmongkol Sitnoenpayom || Lumpinee Stadium || Bangkok, Thailand || Decision || 5 || 3:00  

|-  style="text-align:center; background:#cfc;"
| 1979-12-11|| Win||align=left| Fahmongkol Sitnoenpayom || Lumpinee Stadium || Bangkok, Thailand || Decision || 5 || 3:00  

|-  style="text-align:center; background:#cfc;"
| 1979-11-09|| Win ||align=left| Wisanupon Saksamut || Lumpinee Stadium || Bangkok, Thailand || Decision|| 5 ||3:00
|-
! style=background:white colspan=9 |

|-  style="text-align:center; background:#fbb;"
| 1979-09-04|| Loss ||align=left| Kongsamut Sor Thanikul || Lumpinee Stadium || Bangkok, Thailand || Decision || 5 || 3:00

|-  style="text-align:center; background:#cfc;"
| 1979-08-17|| Win ||align=left| Samart Payakaroon || Lumpinee Stadium || Bangkok, Thailand || KO || 3 ||

|-  style="text-align:center; background:#fbb;"
| 1979-07-24|| Loss ||align=left| Jampatong Na Nontachai || Lumpinee Stadium || Bangkok, Thailand || Decision || 5 || 3:00  

|-  style="text-align:center; background:#cfc;"
| 1979-06-26|| Win ||align=left| Surachai Kangwanprai || Lumpinee Stadium || Bangkok, Thailand || Decision || 5 || 3:00

|-  style="text-align:center; background:#cfc;"
| 1979-05-14|| Win ||align=left| Jockylek PhetUbon || Rajadamnern Stadium || Bangkok, Thailand || Decision || 5 ||3:00

|-  style="text-align:center; background:#cfc;"
| 1979-04-20 || Win ||align=left| Weerachai Sakkomkhai ||Lumpinee Stadium || Bangkok, Thailand || Decision || 5 ||3:00 

|-  style="text-align:center; background:#c5d2ea;"
| 1979-02-23|| Draw||align=left| Samart Payakaroon || Lumpinee Stadium || Bangkok, Thailand ||Decision || 5 || 3:00

|-  style="text-align:center; background:#fbb;"
| 1979-02-02|| Loss||align=left| Supakiat Ekayothin || Lumpinee Stadium || Bangkok, Thailand || Decision || 5 ||3:00

|-  style="text-align:center; background:#cfc;"
| 1979-01-13|| Win ||align=left| Jampatong Na Nontachai || Lumpinee Stadium || Bangkok, Thailand || Decision || 5 ||3:00
|-
| colspan=9 | Legend:

References

Flyweight kickboxers
Paruhatlek Sitchunthong
Paruhatlek Sitchunthong
Living people
1961 births